Klootchman Canyon is a canyon on the Stikine River in northwestern British Columbia, Canada, located south of a bend in the river known as the Devil's Elbow.

Klootchman Canyon is also an alternate but unofficial name for Klootch Canyon on the Skeena River.

See also
List of Chinook Jargon placenames

References
BCGNIS "Klootchman Canyon"

Stikine Country
Chinook Jargon place names
Canyons and gorges of British Columbia